Of the 14 Massachusetts incumbents, only half were re-elected.

Massachusetts law required a majority for election, which was not met in the 1st and 6th districts, necessitating a second trial that carried over until 1801.

See also 
 United States House of Representatives elections, 1800 and 1801
 List of United States representatives from Massachusetts

1800
Massachusetts
Massachusetts
United States House of Representatives
United States House of Representatives